Udaya Studios was one of the oldest film studios in the Malayalam film industry of India. It was established in 1947 by director-producer Kunchacko (1912–1976) and film distributor K. V. Koshy in Pathirappally, Alappuzha in Kerala.  The studio influenced the gradual shift of Malayalam film industry from its original base of Chennai, Tamil Nadu to Trivandrum, now considered a milestone in the history of Malayalam film industry. The first film of the studio was Vellinakshatram (1949).

The films produced at the studio were produced under the banner of K & K Combines, and later under Excel Productions (also spelt X. L. Productions). Udaya's professional rivalry with P. Subramaniam's Merryland Studio was quite famous. After Excel Productions became defunct, Kunchacko Boban established a new film production company named Udaya Pictures in 2016.

History 
Kunchacko established a film production company named Udaya Pictures in 1947, though he continued production at traditional base of Malayalam film, Chennai, but it all changed in 1947 when he came together with film distributors K. V. Koshy and R. A. Krishnan and established Udaya Studios in Alleppey (Alappuzha), and in time the studio also set up its own distribution network. Soon it had a string of successes with blockbusters based on Vadakkan Pattu.
Unniyarcha (1961)
Palattukoman (1962)
Othenante Makan (1970)
Aromalunni (1972)
Ponnapuram Kotta (1973)
Thumbolarcha (1974)
Kannappanunni (1977)
Palattu Kunjikannan (1980)

After Kunchako's death in 1976, his son, director Boban Kunchacko, took over the functioning, but after his death in 2004 at the age of 55, the studio saw some bad days. 
However, Dr. Avinash Unnithan (Suryamangalam Group) has purchased the plot where the studio was located and another studio under a different name is in preparation to be set up, like an air-conditioned shooting floor and other facilities attached to it, but also taking utmost care to preserve the old structures, thereby keeping alive the nostalgic feel of the place.

The legendary Udaya Pictures banner is still owned by famous cine actor Kunchacko Boban, who is also the grandson of Kunchacko. Udaya has made a comeback after 30 years by producing the movie Kocchavva Paulo Ayyappa Coelho.

Resuming production
Years after the defunct Excel Productions, Kunchacko Boban established a new film production company Udaya Pictures and produced the 2016 film Kochauvva Paulo Ayyappa Coelho directed by Sidhartha Siva, thus reviving the prestigious Malayalam production house after 30 years.

See also
 Navodaya Studio
 Merryland Studio

References

External links 
 Udaya Studios at Wikimapia

Film distributors of India
Film production companies of Kerala
Indian film studios
Mass media companies established in 1942
Buildings and structures in Alappuzha
1942 establishments in India